This is a list of notable players of Newport County Football Club.

Newport County Hall of Fame
The Newport County Hall of Fame was launched on 3 April 2009 by Andrew Taylor, club programme columnist and author of Look Back in Amber: Memories of Newport County. Fans can nominate players to be considered by a committee. To date there have been five sets of inductions with further inductions planned regularly.

International honours

Full internationals
The following players received the following full international caps while playing for Newport County:

Semi-pro internationals
The following players have received semi-pro international caps while playing for Newport County:

Youth internationals
The following players have received schoolboy, under 17, under 19 or under 21 international caps while playing for Newport County:

PFA Team of the Year
The following players were selected for the PFA Team of the Year whilst playing for Newport County:
1973–74  Brian Godfrey (Fourth Division) 
1979–80  Keith Oakes (Fourth Division) 
1985–86  Terry Boyle (Third Division)
2020-21  Josh Sheehan (League Two)
2021-22  Dom Telford (League Two)

Football League appearances for Newport County

Over 200 football league appearances since 1989 (as at 15 March 2023)

Over 100 football league appearances since 1989

Over 200 football league appearances before 1989

Over 100 football league appearances before 1989

Other notable former players
Note: Inclusion criteria should be stated

# On the list of Football League 100 Legends, a list of "100 legendary football players" produced by The Football League in 1998, to celebrate the 100th season of League football.

References

Players
 
Lists of association football players by club in Wales
Association football player non-biographical articles